The Adelphi Genetics Forum is a non-profit learned society based in the United Kingdom. Its aims are "to promote the public understanding of human heredity and to facilitate informed debate about the ethical issues raised by advances in reproductive technology."

It was founded by Sybil Gotto in 1907 as the Eugenics Education Society, with the aim of promoting the research and understanding of eugenics. Members came predominately from the professional class and included eminent scientists such as Francis Galton. The Society engaged in advocacy and research to further their eugenic goals, and members participated in activities such as lobbying Parliament, organizing lectures, and producing propaganda. It became the Eugenics Society in 1924 (often referred to as the British Eugenics Society to distinguish it from others). From 1909 to 1968 it published The Eugenics Review, a scientific journal dedicated to eugenics. Membership reached its peak during the 1930s.

The Society was renamed the Galton Institute in 1989. In 2021, it was renamed the Adelphi Genetics Forum. The organisation is currently based in Wandsworth, London.

History

Creation of the Eugenics Education Society 

The Eugenics Education Society (EES) was founded in 1907 at the impetus of 21-year-old Sybil Gotto, a widowed social reformer. Inspired by Francis Galton's work on eugenics, Gotto began looking for supporters to start an organization aimed at educating the public about the benefits of eugenics. She was introduced to the lawyer Montague Crackanthorpe, who would become the second president of the EES, by James Slaughter, the Secretary of the Sociological Society. Crackanthorpe introduced Gotto to Galton, the statistician who coined the term "eugenics." Galton would go on to be Honorary President of the Society from 1907 to 1911. Gotto and Crackanthorpe presented their vision before a committee of the Moral Education League, requesting that the League change its name to the Eugenic and Moral Education League, but the committee decided that a new organization should be formed exclusively devoted to eugenics. The EES was located in Eccleston Square, London.The goals of Eugenics Education Society, as stated in first issue of the Eugenics Review were:

 “Persistently to set forth the National Importance of Eugenics in order to modify public opinion, and create a sense of responsibility in the respect of bringing all matters pertaining to human parenthood under the domination of Eugenic ideals.
 To spread a knowledge of the Laws of heredity so far as they are surely known, and so far as that knowledge might affect the improvement of the race.
 To further Eugenic Teaching at home, in the schools, and elsewhere."

Membership 
The EES did not exist in isolation, but was rather a part of a large network of Victorian reform groups that existed in Britain at the turn of the twentieth century. Members of the Society were also involved in the National Association for the Care and Protection of the Feeble-minded, the Society for Inebrity, the Charity Organisation Society, and the Moral Education League. The British eugenics movement was a predominantly middle class and professional class phenomenon. Most members of the EES were educated and prominent in their fields – at one point all members were listed in professional directories. Two-thirds of the members were scientists, and the 1914 Council of the EES was dominated by professors and physicians. Women constituted a significant portion of the Society’s members, exceeding 50% in 1913 and 40% in 1937. While the majority of members came from the professional class, there were also a few members from the clergy and aristocracy, such as Reverend William Inge, the Dean of St Paul’s Cathedral, and the Earl and Countess of Limerick. 

The Society underwent considerable growth in its early years. By 1911, the London headquarters was supplemented by branches in Cambridge, "Oxford, Liverpool, Manchester, Birmingham, Southampton, Glasgow, and Belfast," as well as abroad in "Australia and New Zealand". The Society found support in leading academic institutions. Statistician R. A. Fisher was a founding member of the Cambridge University Branch, where Leonard Darwin, Reginald Punnett, and Reverend Inge lectured about the eugenic dangers a fertile working class posed to the educated middle class.

Activities

1907 to 1939
The main activities the Eugenics Education Society engaged in were research, propaganda, and legislative lobbying. Many campaigns were joint efforts with other social reform groups. The EES met with 59 other organizations between 1907 and 1935.

Shortly after the Society was founded, members protested the closing of London institutions housing alcoholic women. A resolution was drafted proposing that alcoholics be segregated to prevent their reproduction, as the EES held the eugenic belief that alcoholism was heritable. This resolution proved unsuccessful in Parliament in 1913.

In 1910, the Society's Committee on Poor Law Reform refuted both the Majority and Minority Reports of the Royal Commission on the Poor Law, declaring their belief that poverty was rooted in the genetic deficiencies of the working class. This view was published in a special Poor Law issue of the Eugenics Review. The Committee suggested that paupers be detained in workhouses, under the authority of the Poor Law Guardians, to prevent their breeding. The same year, E. J. Lidbetter, EES member and former employee of the Poor Law Authority in London, attempted to prove the hereditary nature of poverty by compiling and studying the pedigrees of impoverished families.

In 1912, President Leonard Darwin assembled a Research Committee to standardize the format and symbols used in pedigree studies. The members of the Committee were Edgar Schuster, Alexander M. Carr-Saunders, E. J. Lidbetter, Major Greenwood, Sybil Gotto, and A. F. Tredgold. The standardized pedigree they produced was published in the Eugenics Review and later adopted by Charles Davenport's Eugenics Record Office at Cold Spring Harbor in the United States.

In 1912, a group of physicians from the EES met unsuccessfully with the President of the Local Government Board to advocate for the institutionalization of those infected with venereal disease. The Society’s interest in venereal disease continued during WWI, when the Royal Commission on Venereal Diseases was formed with the inclusion of members of the EES.

In 1916, EES President Leonard Darwin, son of Charles Darwin, published a pamphlet entitled “Quality not Quantity,” encouraging members of the professional class to have more children. Darwin proposed a tax rebate for middle-class families in 1917, but the resolution was unsuccessful in Parliament. In 1919, Darwin stated his belief that fertility was inversely proportional to economic class before the Royal Commission on Income Tax. He feared the falling birth rate of the middle-class would result in a “national danger.”The Eugenics Education Society was renamed the Eugenics Society in 1924 to emphasize its commitment to scientific research extending beyond the role of public education.
In the 1920s and 1930s, members of the Eugenics Society advocated for graded Family Allowances in which wealthier families would be given more funds for having more children, thus incentivizing fertility in the middle and upper classes. Statistician and EES member R. A. Fisher argued in 1932 that existing Family Allowances that only funded the poor were dysgenic, as they did not reward the breeding of individuals the EES viewed as eugenically desirable.

In 1930, the Eugenics Society formed a Committee for Legalising Sterilisation, producing propaganda pamphlets touting sterilisation as there solution for eliminating heritable feeblemindedness.

During this time period members of the Society such as Julian Huxley expressed support for eutelegenesis, a eugenic proposal to artificially inseminate women with the sperm of men deemed mentally and physically superior in an effort to better the race.

1942 to 1989 
The Eugenics Society underwent a hiatus during the Second World War and did not reconvene until 1942, under the leadership of General Secretary Carlos Blacker. In the postwar period, the Society shifted its focus from class differences to marriage, fertility, and the changing racial makeup of the UK.

In 1944, R. C. Wofinden published an article in the Eugenics Review describing the features of "mentally deficient" working-class families and questioning whether mental deficiency led to poverty or vice versa. Blacker argued that poor heredity was the cause of poverty, but other members of the Society, such as Hilda Lewis, disagreed with this view.

Following WWII, British eugenicists concerned by rising divorce rates and falling birth rates attempted to promote marriages between "desirable" individuals while preventing marriages between those deemed eugenically unfit. The British Social Hygiene Council, a group with ties to the Eugenics Society, formed the Marriage Guidance Council, an organization that offered pre-marital counseling to young couples.In 1954, the Eugenics Society was referred to by the North Kensington Marriage Welfare Centre's pamphlet "Eugenic Guidance," as a source for consultation for couples worried about passing on their "weaknesses."

As a result of the British Nationality Act of 1948, which enabled Commonwealth citizens to immigrate to the UK, postwar Britain saw an influx of non-white populations. The Eugenics Society became concerned with changes to the racial makeup of the country, exemplified by its publication of G. C. L. Bertram's 1958 broadsheet on immigration from the West Indies. Bertram claimed that races were biologically distinct due to their evolved adaptations to different environments, and that miscegenation should only be permitted between similar races.

In 1952, Blacker stepped down as Secretary of the Eugenics Society to become the administrative chairman of the International Planned Parenthood Federation, or IPPF. The IPPF was sponsored in part by the Eugenics Society and headquartered within the Society's offices in London. Blacker's influence continued in 1962, when he published an article in the Eugenics Review defending voluntary sterilization as humanitarian effort beneficial to mothers and their existing children.

The last volume of the Eugenics Review was published in 1968. It was succeeded by the Journal of Biosocial Science. Following the 1960s, the Eugenics Society experienced a loss of support and prestige and eventually shifted its focus from eugenics in Britain to biosocial issues such as fertility and population control in Third World countries. The Eugenics Society changed its name to the Galton Institute in 1989, a reflection of the negative public sentiment towards eugenics following WWII.

Position on eugenics 
The Galton Institute's website currently states that "the Galton Institute rejects outright the theoretical basis and practice of coercive eugenics, which it regards as having no place in modern life." Furthermore, "the current Galton Institute has disassociated itself completely from any interest in the theory and practice of eugenics, but recognises the importance of the acknowledgement and preservation of its historical records in the interest of improving awareness of the 20th century eugenics movements in the social and political context of the times." Former President Veronica van Heyningen has acknowledged that "Galton was a terrible racist," but she believes it is "reasonable to honour him by giving his name to institutions" due to his significant contribution to the field of genetics.

Prominent members 

 Leonard Arthur, tried for murder in 1981 but acquitted
 Arthur Balfour
 Florence Barrett
 William Beveridge
 Paul Blanshard
 Walter Bodmer
 Russell Brain, 1st Baron Brain
 Chris Brand
 Cyril Burt
 Neville Chamberlain, British Prime Minister (1937–1940)
 Winston Churchill, Honorary Vice President
 John Cockburn
 David Coleman
 James Herbert Curle
 Charles D'Arcy
 Charles Davenport, Vice President (1931)
 Mary Dendy
 Robert Geoffrey Edwards
 Havelock Ellis
 Hans Eysenck
 Ronald Fisher
 E. B. Ford
 Agnes Fry
 Francis Galton, after whom the institute was eventually renamed
 Charles Goethe
 Ezra Gosney
 Madison Grant
 David Starr Jordan, Vice President (1916, 1931)
 Franz Josef Kallmann
 John Harvey Kellogg
 John Maynard Keynes, Director (1937–1944), Vice President (1937)
 Richard Lynn
 James Meade
 Peter Medawar
 Naomi Mitchison
 Sybil Neville-Rolfe, née Gotto, founder
 Henry Fairfield Osborn 
 Frederick Osborn
 Roger Pearson
 Alfred Ploetz, Vice President (1916)
 Margaret Pyke
 Margaret Sanger
 Eliot Slater
 Marie Stopes
 James Mourilyan Tanner
 Richard Titmuss
 Alice Vickery
 Frank Yates

Presidents 
Past presidents.

Eugenics Education Society (1911-1926)
 James Crichton-Browne, President (1908–1909)
 Montague Crackanthorpe, President (1909–1911)
 Leonard Darwin, son of Charles Darwin, President (1911–1929)
Eugenics Society (1926-1989)
 Bernard Mallet, President (1929–1933)
 Humphry Rolleston, President (1933–1935)
 Thomas Horder, President (1935–1949)
 Alexander Carr-Saunders, President (1949–1953)
 Charles Galton Darwin, grandson of Charles Darwin, President (1953–1959)
 Julian Huxley, Vice-president (1937–1944), President (1959–1962)
 James Gray, President (1962–1965) 
 Robert Platt, President (1965–1968)
Alan Parkes, President (1968–1970)
P. R. Cox, President (1970–1972)
C. O. Carter, President (1972–1976)
Harry Armytage, President (1976–1982)
Bernard Benjamin, President (1982–1987)
Galton Institute
Margaret Sutherland, President (1987–1993)
G. Ainsworth Harrison, President (1993–1994)
Peter Diggory, President (1994–1996)
Robert Peel, President (1996–1999)
John Timson, President (1999–2002)
Steve Jones, President (2002–2008)
Walter Bodmer, President (2008–2014)
Veronica van Heyningen, President (2014–2020)
Turi King, President (2020–present)

See also
American Eugenics Society
Amy Barrington
Eugenics 
Human Betterment Foundation
Arthur Jensen
Walter Kistler
Glayde Whitney
Social hygiene movement

References

External links 
 Galton Institute
 

Abortion-rights organisations in the United Kingdom
Eugenics in the United Kingdom
Eugenics organizations
Learned societies of the United Kingdom
Organisations based in the London Borough of Ealing
Research institutes established in 1907
1907 establishments in England